HMS Terrible was when designed the largest steam-powered wooden paddle wheel frigate built for the Royal Navy.

Characteristics

Dimensions
Terrible was designed by Oliver Lang, master shipwright at Woolwich Dockyard.

Construction
Terrible was laid down at HMNB Devonport on 13 November 1843 under the name HMS Simoom. She was renamed on 23 December 1842, and launched on 6 February 1845. She was constructed of Honduras mahogany, East India teak and well seasoned English oak. She had one deck more than Retribution. With three masts and four funnels in two widely spaced pairs, she had a unique appearance among ships of this type.

Propulsion
The engines of Terrible were made by Maudslay and Co. wand were a similar pair as those on Retributution. They cost 41,250 GBP and each had 400 hp. The weight of the engines was 212 tons, the boilers 250 ton, the water in the boilers 138, the paddle wheels 44 and the coal boxes 16 tons, for a total of 560 tons. The coals boxes were to contain 800 tons of coal. Therefore, a total of 1,360 tons was spent on the propulsion.

Armament
The heavy machinery still left some weight that could be spent on the armament. Plans were to mount 16 56-pounder 85 cwt guns and 4 10-inch granade guns. The 56-pounders would be mounted in a broadside arrangement between decks. Of the granade guns two would be mounted on pivots, and two as broadside guns on the weather deck. The boats would be armed with one brass 6-pounder, two 18-pounder carronades, and two 12-pounder carronades. Later the brass 6-pounder and two brass carronades were said to be saluting, or signal guns.

Career

Service in the Channel and the Mediterranean
Terrible was commissioned on 5 December 1845 under the command of Captain William Ramsay and was first attached to the Channel Fleet. In 1847 she was sent to Portuguese Angola to transport the Portuguese exiles under the leadership of the Count of Bonfim back to Lisbon, as stipulated by the Convention of Gramido. On 2 January 1850, she ran aground at Plymouth whilst on a voyage from Portsmouth to Lisbon, Portugal. She was refloated and taken in to Plymouth. Subsequently, she served in the Mediterranean.

During the Crimean War

Terrible saw active service during the Crimean War. On 6 November 1853, commanded by Captain James Johnstone McCleverty, she left England carrying Rear-Admiral Sir Edmund Lyons, who had been appointed second-in-command of the Mediterranean Fleet.  Terrible then joined Admiral James Dundas's fleet in the Black Sea, where she served during the Crimean War. On 7 October 1854 she landed some of her 68-pounder guns at Balaclava to be used in the siege of Sevastopol. At the naval bombardment of Sevastopol on 17 October Terrible was the northernmost ship of the Allied line and successfully bombarded , the northern fort protecting Sevastopol harbour.

Further service

Between 30 November 1858 and February 1859 Terrible was put at the disposal of William Gladstone for the duration of his tenure as Extraordinary Lord High Commissioner of the Ionian Islands. On 14 January 1865, she ran aground at Sheerness, Kent. In 1869 she was one of three ships employed to move the specially built 'Bermuda' Dry Dock across the Atlantic from Madeira to Ireland Island, Bermuda. She was broken up in 1879.

See also
 List of frigate classes of the Royal Navy

Notes

References
  Encyclopedia of Ships ed. Tony Gibbons (London: Amber Books, 2001), p. 87 
  http://www.pdavis.nl/ShowShip.php?id=2168
 
 

Frigates of the Royal Navy
1845 ships
Ships built in Deptford
Maritime incidents in January 1850
Maritime incidents in January 1865